The Devil's Mask is a 1946 American crime film directed by Henry Levin and starring Anita Louise, Jim Bannon and Michael Duane. The film was the second of three B pictures based on the popular radio series I Love a Mystery. As well as its crime theme, the film also incorporates elements of horror.

Synopsis
Two private detectives are asked to go to a museum to meet a woman who claims she is about to be murdered by her stepdaughter. The case becomes linked to a plane crash, a shrunken head just sent to the museum, and a scientist who disappeared during an expedition to South America.

Cast
 Anita Louise as Janet Mitchell 
 Jim Bannon as Jack Packard 
 Michael Duane as Rex Kennedy 
 Mona Barrie as Louise Mitchell 
 Barton Yarborough as Doc Long 
 Ludwig Donath as Dr. Karger 
 Paul E. Burns as Leon Hartman 
 Frank Wilcox as Prof. Arthur Logan
 Bud Averill as Museum Guard 
 Edward Earle as E.R. Willard 
 John Elliott as John the Butler 
 Fred Godoy as Mendoza
 Richard Hale as Curator Raymond Halliday 
 Coulter Irwin as Frank 
 Thomas E. Jackson as Detective Captain Quinn 
 Frank Mayo as Gordon R. Mitchell 
 Mary Newton as Karger's Nurse 
 Harry Strang as Brophy - Night Watchman

Critical reception
TV Guide called it an "enjoyable programmer".

References

Bibliography
 Bansak, Edmund G. Fearing the Dark: The Val Lewton Career. McFarland, 2003.
 Sterling, Christopher H. & O'Dell, Cary. The Concise Encyclopedia of American Radio. Routledge, 2011.

External links
 
 
 
 

1946 films
American crime films
1946 crime films
Films directed by Henry Levin
Columbia Pictures films
American black-and-white films
1940s English-language films
1940s American films